Evil Genius is a novel written by Catherine Jinks and published in 2005 by Allen & Unwin, Australia. The book follows the story of Cadel Piggot, a child prodigy.

The book is followed by the sequels Genius Squad and Genius Wars.

Synopsis
The story begins when a boy named Cadel Piggot is taken to a psychologist because his prodigious intelligence has led him to hack high-security networks. His egoism harms or destroys everyone around him until he is saved by the love of a girl named Sonja Pirovic, who has cerebral palsy, but with an intellect equal to his.

His quest for moral direction is complicated by Phineas Darkkon, an evil genius of sorts whom he is told is his father, and Thaddeus Roth, his psychologist whom the police identify as Prosper English, a notorious criminal and right-hand man of Dr. Darkkon, and who later also claims to be Cadel's father.

He also meets a number of other talented people at the Axis Institute, which is the university Phineas Darkkon had created for him to get his World Domination degree. His specialty is IT and hacking.

Characters

Main characters
Cadel Piggot/Darkkon: Cadel is a genius, who at the age of 7 is sent to the office of Thaddeus Roth. He later attends the axis Institute and ultimately destroys it. Cadel somewhat resembles the main character, Dexter, from the hit cartoon show Dexter's Laboratory. He is described to have chestnut, curly hair and big baby blue eyes. He is also very short and is often described as being 'girlish' because of his shocking resemblance to his mother. He seems to have a natural affinity for systems or patterns of any kind such as train stations but more specifically computers.

Sonja Pirovic/Kay-Lee McDougall: A girl with cerebral palsy that Cadel met through Partner Post, one of his criminal activities. Although she was acting through another person, her caretaker, she was the person behind the messages. She rivals Cadel in intelligence but in a different field; she specializes in mathematics and cryptography. Most of the correspondence between Cadel and Sonja is through a code of some form typically involving the periodic table. She is also the reason for Cadels sudden change of heart, one that was only triggered through his discovery and curiosity.

Thaddeus Roth/Prosper English: Thaddeus plays the part of Cadel's (although he doesn't need it) psychologist for much of the book, encouraging him to nurture his manipulative nature. Throughout the book Thaddeus steers Cadel towards the path of evil, without being too obvious about it. He is a master of manipulation, and easily convinces Cadel that his way is the way to go. It is later found out that his real name is Prosper English, and that he claims to be Cadel's real father.[2] Cadel discovers he is also the murderer of his (Cadel's) mother. He is described as having sleek black hair, and snake like eyes. Tall and slender, he is fit for his age.

Gazo Kovacs: A boy from England and one of Cadel's only friends at the Axis Institute. Gazo does not have the intelligence required to attend the institute, but was recruited for the stench he emits under high stress. Due to his "condition", he is required to wear a protective suit and breathing apparatus at all times, unless he is alone. He also seems to take to Cadel very quickly and will not leave him alone, not even in Hardware Heaven. Gazo assists Cadel in his scheme to rid Axis of certain staff members. He was also the one who alerted Thaddeus to Cadel's kidnapping. He has a knack for prying open car doors.

Phineas Darkkon Cadel's "father" - the founder of the Axis Institute, was imprisoned for various black market-related crimes. He claims to be Cadel's real father, and seems to be working with Dr. Thaddeus Roth. Frog like and sometimes described as being "crazy", he was the husband to Cadels mother (Elspeth) and legal father to Cadel (not biological).

Jemima and Niobe "Gemini" (Jem 'n' Ni): Two of Cadel's classmates at the Axis Institute, who treat Cadel with more fondness than others because of his youth. The two teenagers are identical twins who were brought to the attention of Axis faculty for their techniques in shoplifting. Techniques such as using their "identicalness" to stay in the store after it is lockup time and take what ever they want. Gemini are students in poisoning at the institute.

Com Daniels: Com is one of Cadel's classmates in Ulysses "Virus" Vee's class about computers and hacking. He is great at hacking, but does not often speak with other members of the class. In fact, one of the students assumes that Com doesn't even remember how to speak. Cadel occasionally compares him to a machine because has never been spotted leaving his computer. He has a twin sister named Dorothea Daniels, nicknamed Dot.

Minor characters
Stuart and Lanna Piggot: Cadel's adopted parents are very well to do, due to the fact that Stuart is a lawyer that just can't resist receiving assets. Though Cadel refers to him as a "Corporate Cog" and says that he cares only about securing assets. Lanna Piggot was a fashion and makeup consultant but later became an interior decorator. Once Cadel found out that she and Stuart were working for Thaddeus, Cadel was repulsed by them.

The Axis Institute staff:

Thaddeus Roth: Thaddeus Roth is the Chancellor of the Axis Institute also the Professor of the School of Deception and teaches two classes in the school of deception - Coping skills (Basic Lying) and Psychology (Manipulation).

Max de Litto/The Maestro: Max de Litto teaches Pragmatic Philosophy (Pure Evil). After fishing around in Max's emails, Cadel decides that Max is a little paranoid and a loner.

Art East: Art East teaches Cultural appreciation (Forgery). At first his class was very challenging for Cadel, but soon enough Cadel overcame this obstacle also.

Barry Deakin/Dr. Deal: "Dr. Deal teaches law (loopholes). He accidentally assaults Cadel in an old men's bathroom and tries to bribe him with money. But after a few exchanges of words Cadel says "I will think about it".

Alias: Alias is the teacher of personal presentation (disguise). According to all of his emails, he is not that liked among the institute's teachers with the exception of Tracey Lane who has dated many other members of the faculty. As a result, he is very lonely.

Dr. Ulysses "The Virus" Vee: Teacher of Computer Science (Infiltration) has a sty and seems to have absolutely no lifestyle of any kind but he does have a dirty little secret and access to all the teachers' emails which in turn allows Cadel access to those emails.

Reception
Reaction to the novel was mixed to positive. The website Strange Horizons said "Jinks never underestimates her audience, and builds a rich and morally complex plot. There are messages in the text but no preaching." Popmatters, however, stated that "[Jinks’] storytelling falls into implausible valleys at times, but overall, she's articulate and engaging."

Awards
2006 Davitt Award for Crime Fiction (Young Adult)

References

External links
Evil Genius series blog

2005 novels
2005 science fiction novels
Australian science fiction novels
Australian fantasy novels
Australian young adult novels
Australian children's novels
Children's science fiction novels
Children's fantasy novels
Young adult fantasy novels
Novels by Catherine Jinks
Allen & Unwin books
2005 children's books
Works about computer hacking